Ocoee High School is a public secondary school located in Ocoee, Florida, 12.5 miles west of Orlando. Since 2005 Ocoee High School has served students from the cities of Ocoee, Apopka, Winter Garden, and Pine Hills. Ocoee High School is currently serving 2,479 students.

Mascot
The Ocoee High School's mascot is a Knight wearing a gold tunic that bears the image of a rising cardinal. A cardinal was the mascot of the old Ocoee High School which was converted into a middle school in 1975. The knight symbolizes a protector that guards against forces that would cause the school to become dismantled and fold like its predecessor.

Campus
Ocoee High School is on fifty-two acres near Lake Apopka. It was the largest of nine new schools opening in Orange County in 2005.  Before the high school opened, the school board members considered naming the high school Crown Point High, Platinum High or Unity High. The Orange County Public School (OCPS) decided on the name, Ocoee High School, in memory of the old Ocoee High School.
Ocoee High School is built on the Smaller Learning Communities Model. This places students in one of the four sub-schools for their core classes. The Ocoee sub-schools are called: Columbia, Harvard, Princeton, and Yale.  Each sub-school has two counselors, a dean, and an assistant principal. Each of these smaller schools has approximately 150 students.

Ocoee High School is built on this model because research has shown that schools within a school have decreased dropout rates and they experience fewer discipline issues. "The idea is to create a small learning community for students," explained former Principal Mike Armbruster. "Instead of mingling with 2,700 students, they'll be with 700, so they don't get lost between the cracks."  Ocoee High School adopted the smaller learning community model (SCL) as a part of school reform. The school board wanted students to stop getting lost in the crowd. SCL allow students to get to know each other and counselors, who push them to take more-advanced classes. "A kid who is connected...is more likely to graduate," said former principal Armbruster.

Agriculture 
Ocoee High School has a premier Agriculture education. The Animal Science program is led by Ms. Amy Anderson. Ms. Anderson was the agriculture teacher at  Ocoee Middle School until 2017. Mr. Jordan leads the Plant Science portion.

Music
The foremost program in the Ocoee High School Music Department is the band.  The Ocoee High School bands include: the Freshman Band, the Symphonic Band, the Jazz Band, the Percussion Ensemble, the Winter Guard, the Spring Dance Company, the Wind Ensemble, the Marching Band, the Knights Visual Ensemble (dance team and color guard), and the Indoor Percussion Unit. The Marching Band has performed in the Cotton Bowl Music Festival, the Florida Citrus Parade, the Ikea Thanksgiving Parade, multiple Under Armour  Football All-American Games that were broadcast on  Entertainment and Sports Programming Network (ESPN), multiple Macy's Christmas Day Parades at Universal Studios Florida, and the New York City Veteran's Day Parade.  The band is also often featured in the Florida Classic Battle Of The Bands.

The band staff is headed by director Bernard Hendricks, Jr.

The Ocoee High School music program also includes a concert choir, a show choir (Knight Fever), and an advanced show choir (Excalibur) in which is an auditioned group that is similar to Glee, and a newly formed gospel choir, among other organizations.

Academics
The Class of 2009 had 680 graduates. 54% of students reported that they planned to attend either a two year college or a vocational college, 37% of students reported that they plan on attending a four-year college.

Ocoee High School's average score for both the verbal and math sections of the SAT in 2009 was 530, and for the writing section of the SAT, the average score was 500. These scores are below average on both the Florida and national scales.

The Sword in the Stone
"Sword in the Stone" trophy is a peer acknowledgement award. The "Sword in the Stone" concept was suggested by Matt Fitzpatrick, a former teacher at Ocoee High School. Fitzpatrick had seen this concept in action at another school, where they called it "You Rock." The "Sword in the Stone" trophy is a hand sized rock with a small sword in it. It is passed among faculty when a staff member does something special for another staff member. The award is also announced in an email to the entire staff so that everyone knows the reason for the recognition. The recipient holds the trophy for a week before passing it on to the next deserving teacher. For example, Ms. Gillam, a teacher at Ocoee High School, passed the trophy to Ms. Thorpe, because the students that Ms. Gillam received from Ms. Thorpe's class were very well prepared. Ms. Gillam said, "they say you can tell the quality of a teacher by the quality of the student, and I can tell that she is a great teacher by the students that she has given to me."

Notable people

Students
Cap Capi, football defensive end for Jacksonville Jaguars
David Efianayi (born 1995), basketball player in the Israeli Basketball Premier League
Grant Riller, basketball player for the Delaware Blue Coats of the NBA G League

Faculty
Jason Boltus (athletic coach), football quarterback
Greg Jefferson (sociology teacher), football defensive end for NFL

External links
Ocoee High School

References

High schools in Orange County, Florida
Orange County Public Schools
Public high schools in Florida
Ocoee, Florida
2005 establishments in Florida
Educational institutions established in 2005